Desmia melaleucalis is a moth in the family Crambidae. It was described by George Hampson in 1899. It is found in Ecuador.

The wingspan is about 30 mm. The forewings are purplish black with a short hyaline (glass-like) streak below the base of the cell and a triangular spot in the end of the cell, as well as a slight discoidal lunule. The hindwings are hyaline white, with a purplish-black base, costa and terminal area.

References

Moths described in 1899
Desmia
Moths of South America